The Shingo Prize for Operational Excellence is an award for operational excellence given to organizations worldwide by the Shingo Institute, part of the Jon M. Huntsman School of Business at Utah State University in Logan, Utah. In order to be selected as a recipient of the Shingo Prize, an organization "challenges" or applies for the award by first submitting an achievement report that provides data about recent business improvements and accomplishments and then undergoing an onsite audit performed by Shingo Institute examiners. Organizations are scored relative to how closely their culture matches the ideal as defined by the Shingo Model™. Organizations that meet the criteria are awarded the Shingo Prize. Other awards include the Shingo Silver Medallion, the Shingo Bronze Medallion, the Research Award, and the Publication Award.

History of the Shingo Prize

Beginnings: 1988 – 2000
In 1988, Utah State University conferred an honorary doctorate to Shigeo Shingo, a Japanese industrial engineer and author credited for his contribution to many of the principles, elements, theories, and tools associated with the Toyota Production System. That same year, Utah State University established what was then called the North American Shingo Prizes for Excellence in Manufacturing in his honor.

The Shingo Prize for Excellence in Manufacturing was first only awarded to organizations within the United States. By 1994, however, Ford Electronics in Markham, Ontario, became the first Canadian organization to receive the award. By 1997, the award was given to the first Mexican organization, Industrias CYDSA Bayer.

In 2000, BusinessWeek referred to the Shingo Prize as the "Nobel Prize for manufacturing."

Evolution of the Prize: 2004 – 2008

In 2004, a "Finalist" category was added to recognize challengers that scored well but didn't meet the Shingo Prize level.

In 2005, a separate awards system was established for public sector organizations. Three levels existed in the public sector awards category: Gold, Silver and Bronze.

In 2008, Utah State University changed the name of the award to the Shingo Prize for Operational Excellence in order to reflect altered criteria that made the award available to organizations from all industries, not exclusively manufacturing. The focus of the award was also shifted away from recognizing only the use of lean manufacturing tools to recognizing the overall organizational culture. This was in response to growing concern about the validity of what the Shingo Prize was supposed to signify about its recipients.

According to Robert Miller, former executive director of the Shingo Institute, "...we began to see small signs of fracture along the edges. Critics of our selection process began to emerge in blogs and websites and eventually began to confront us directly. They told us they were beginning to lose confidence in recommending, carte blanche, our recipients as benchmarking sites for their members. Over time a great many recipients had not only not moved forward but in fact had lost considerable ground and were no longer considered as role models... Without realizing it, we were evaluating the effective use of tools, the numbers and impact of events, the effectiveness of a lean program, the commitment to have full-time lean coaches, the personality of a change leader – but not deep cultural transformation of the thinking and natural behavior of leaders, managers, and associates."

That same year, the Shingo Model™ was released to demonstrate the role of principles within organizational culture. Shingo examiners began assessing organizational culture more on the degree to which it reflected the Shingo Guiding Principles than on the use of lean manufacturing techniques or tools.

The Shingo Prize Today: 2008 – Present
With a change in scoring criteria in 2008, the average number of organizations receiving the Shingo Prize each year decreased from 11 to 2.

However, Utah State University also established the Shingo Silver and Shingo Bronze Medallion award levels for challengers that scored well but did not meet the Shingo Prize standard. Gold, Silver and Bronze levels had previously been awarded to public sector organizations only, but the public sector awards program ended that year. Since then, public sector organizations have been evaluated to the same criteria as private sector organizations.

In 2009, Ultraframe in Clitheroe, Lancashire, UK, became the first European organization to receive a Shingo award, the Shingo Bronze Medallion. International interest has grown from that time such that in 2014, nine of the 11 Shingo awards were claimed by organizations outside of the United States.

In 2011, Denver Health, Community Health Services received the Shingo Bronze Medallion, becoming the first healthcare organization to receive a Shingo award. In 2012, State Farm Insurance Operations Center in Bloomington, Illinois, also received the Shingo Bronze Medallion, becoming the first financial organization to receive an award.

Awards

Shingo Prize for Operational Excellence
According to the Shingo Institute, the Shingo Prize "is the world’s highest standard for operational excellence" and "a worldwide recognized symbol of an organization's successful establishment of a culture anchored on principles of enterprise excellence." These principles are found as part of the Shingo Model.

Shingo Silver Medallion
The Shingo Silver Medallion is awarded to "those [organizations that are] maturing on the journey [to excellence] with primarily a tool and system focus."

Shingo Bronze Medallion
The Shingo Bronze Medallion is awarded to "those [organizations] in the earlier stages of cultural transformation with primarily a tools focus."

Shingo Publication Award
The Shingo Publication Award recognizes and promotes writing that has had a significant impact and advances the body of knowledge regarding operational excellence. The Shingo Institute is most interested in recognizing thought leadership. The award is given to authors, practitioners, and academicians. Publications can be nominated in three separate categories:

• Historic
A publication that has stood the test of time. It is still one that is commonly used and referenced when referring to organizational excellence. It has historic significance to the development or discovery of principles, systems, concepts, tools, and techniques of organizational excellence. Its content has been expanded upon to build the body of knowledge.

• Impact
A publication that has demonstrated high sales and/or distribution. The content is currently used successfully by many organizations to improve their ability to sustain a culture of organizational excellence. The publication has been widely recognized as new knowledge or an expansion to existing knowledge. The author or authors have a track record of speaking engagements as a result of the publication.

• Up & Coming
A new publication with the potential to be impactful. Sales and/or distribution is encouraging. It has been endorsed publicly by thought leaders. The author or authors are sought-after speakers, on the topics covered in the publication, for conferences, webinars, podcasts, and other third-party learning platforms.

Shingo Institute
The Shingo Prize for Operational Excellence is administered by the Shingo Institute, a program in the Jon M. Huntsman School of Business at Utah State University. Aside from administering the Shingo Prize, the Shingo Institute additionally creates and licenses educational workshops, organizes study tours, offers a AACSB accredited MBA program with a specialization in operational and organizational excellence, and hosts an annual conference in the USA, Latin America and Europe.

Recipients

Site Awards

2008-Present
The following are the recipients of Shingo awards from the time the criteria changed in 2008 to include any industry and to reflect a higher standard of excellence.

1989-2007
The following are the recipients of Shingo awards from the establishment of the Shingo Prize for Excellence in Manufacturing until the criteria and name changed to the Shingo Prize for Operational Excellence in 2008.

Research and Professional Publication Award
The following are recipients of the Shingo Research and Professional Publication Award.

References

Awards by university and college in the United States
Awards established in 1988
Utah State University